The 1963–64 Tercera División season was the 28th since its establishment.

League tables

Group I

Group II

Group III

Group IV

Group V

Group VI-VII

Group VIII

Group IX

Group X

Group XI

Group XII

Group XIII

Group XIV

Group XV

Promotion playoff

Champions

First round

Final Round

Runners-up

First round

Second round

Final Round

Season records
 Most wins: 27, Sabadell.
 Most draws: 12, Vic and Emeritense.
 Most losses: 26, Iruña.
 Most goals for: 106, Racing de Ferrol.
 Most goals against: 89, Atlètic Gironella.
 Most points: 58, Sabadell.
 Fewest wins: 2, Alaior, Ibiza and San Pedro.
 Fewest draws: 0, Iruña.
 Fewest losses: 1, Plus Ultra.
 Fewest goals for: 10, Alaior.
 Fewest goals against: 9, Atlético Baleares.
 Fewest points: 7, Ibiza and San Pedro.

Notes

External links
RSSSF 
Futbolme 

Tercera División seasons
3
Spain